Inquisitor angustiliratus is a species of sea snail, a marine gastropod in the family Pseudomelatomidae, the turrids and allies.

Description
The length of the shell attains 39.5 mm, its diameter 10.8 mm.

Distribution
This species occurs in the Gulf of Aden.

References

 Sysoev, A.V. (1996b) Deep-sea conoidean gastropods collected by the John Murray Expedition, 1933–34. Bulletin of the Natural History Museum of London, Zoology, 62, 1–30

External links
 

angustiliratus
Gastropods described in 1996